Paavathin Sambalam is a 1978 Indian Tamil-language film written and directed by Durai. The film stars R. Muthuraman, Prameela and Sumithra. It was released on 9 December 1978.

Plot

Cast 
R. Muthuraman as David
Prameela as Rosy
Sumithra as Stella
 Jayachandran
 M. N. Nambiar
 Master Sekhar
 Rajbabu
Rajinikanth as Kathiravan (guest appearance)
Suruli Rajan
Lalitha Mani
Manorama

Soundtrack 
The music was composed by Shankar–Ganesh, with lyrics by Alangudi Somu.

Release and reception 
Paavathin Sambalam was released on 9 December 1978. P. S. M. of Kalki said the story had many disgusting and confusing moments.

References

External links 
 
 

1970s Tamil-language films
1978 films
Films directed by Durai
Films scored by Shankar–Ganesh
Indian black-and-white films